Metropolitan Avenue is a major east–west street serving the New York City boroughs of Brooklyn and Queens.

Metropolitan Avenue may also refer to:

New York City Subway stations
Metropolitan Avenue (IND Crosstown Line), serving the  train
Middle Village – Metropolitan Avenue (BMT Myrtle Avenue Line), the northern terminus of the  train
Metropolitan Avenue (BMT Jamaica Line); (demolished)